Alfred Richard Unser (born October 23, 1982) is an American former professional race car driver. Unser has competed in the Indy Lights series and Toyota Atlantics Championship. He is the fourth generation of the famous Unser family.

Al Richard Unser is the son of Al Unser Jr., and grandson of Al Unser Sr. Due to his family connections in auto racing, he has sometimes been known as "Al Unser III" or "Just Al." He is currently a Realtor in Albuquerque at Coldwell Banker Legacy.

Family connections
Al Richard Unser is the son of two-time Indianapolis 500 winner Al Unser Jr., grandson of four-time Indy winner Al Unser Sr., and grandnephew of three-time Indy winner Bobby Unser. Another granduncle, Jerry Unser, drove in the 1958 race but died from injuries suffered in a crash in 1959.

First-cousins-once-removed (Al Unser Jr.'s cousins) Robby and Johnny also drove in the Indianapolis 500. Often considered the third generation of the famous Unser racing family, Al Richard Unser is technically the fourth generation of racers to come out of the family. His great-grandfather Jerry Sr., and Jerry's brother Louis, also were racers, but neither drove in the Indianapolis 500.

During his young childhood years, he was often nicknamed "Mini Al" by the media and fans, all with the expectation that he might follow in his family's footsteps to race professionally. However, as a child, Unser had reservations about becoming a race car driver. For superstitious reasons, his father (Al Unser Jr.) insisted he not be named with the suffix "III". By that time both Al Sr. and Al Jr. were stars on the Indy car circuit. Al Sr. was becoming known by the nickname "Big Al." Al Jr. for a time was known as "Little Al," thus Al Richard Unser became known for a time as "Mini Al."

As he got older and reached his teenage years, he decided to eschew the somewhat unflattering "Mini" nickname, and became known as "Just Al." When starting his professional career, he abandoned any sort of nickname, and has insisted on being referred to as Just Al (i.e., Al Unser), or by his full name, Al Richard Unser.

His first widely-noticed television appearance was at the 1992 Indianapolis 500 at age nine when his father won the race. Unser was seen greeting his father in victory circle. He also posed in official photos with his father and grandfather when Al Jr. won the Indy 500 for the second time in 1994. Unser guest-starred on an episode of Home Improvement alongside his father and grandfather in 1997.

Career biography

Al Richard Unser began driving go karts at age ten, but stopped racing until after earning his driver's license at age sixteen. After attending driving schools, Unser competed in the Skip Barber Western Racing Series in 2002, winning six races and earning "Rookie of the Year" honors. A year later, he posted four top-ten finishes in the 2003 Barber Dodge Pro Series.

2004
In 2004, Unser made his Toyota Atlantics debut, running in four events. His best finish was an 8th place at Montreal. Unser also ran in eight races in the 2004 Infiniti Pro Series. He posted five third place finishes, and won the pole position at Michigan.

Around that same time, Unser's father Al Unser Jr. temporarily retired from driving to help with his career.

2005
Unser posted three top-ten finishes in the first four races of the Infinity Pro Series season, including a 4th place at the Freedom 100 at Indianapolis. He then returned to the Toyota Atlantics, finishing the season 7th in points. He ran ten of twelve events with a best finish of 4th.

At the Indy Lights races at St. Petersburg and Indianapolis Unser competed against fellow third-generation driver Marco Andretti of the famous rival Andretti family. It was the only two times that Al and Marco raced together.

2006
In 2006 Unser drove in two Atlantics series events, but lost his ride to funding issues with the team.

2007
Unser was signed to drive for Playa Del Racing in the Freedom 100 for 2007. He drove in three other oval races, posting three top-tens in the four events.

2008
For 2008, Unser was announced as the full-time driver in the #12 car for Playa Del Racing in Indy Lights. After five races, controlling interest in the team was sold to former Las Vegas restaurateur Eric Zimmerman, who renamed it American Dream Motorsports. After finishing 11th position at Indianapolis, Unser was reportedly released by the new owner and replaced by Tony Turco, who brought sponsorship to the program. The team posted an entry for the Milwaukee 100 on May 31, but the car never took to the track.

Unser's father (Al Jr.) drove during several seasons for Galles Racing, and Al Richard works for Rick Galles' Chevrolet dealership.

Racing record

American open–wheel racing results
(key) (Races in bold indicate pole position)

Barber Dodge Pro Series

Indy Lights

Atlantic Championship

References

1982 births
American people of Swiss-German descent
Living people
Racing drivers from Albuquerque, New Mexico
Racing drivers from New Mexico
Indy Lights drivers
Atlantic Championship drivers
Barber Pro Series drivers
Unser family
Conquest Racing drivers